Agonandra is a genus of plants in the family Opiliaceae described as a genus in 1862.

Agonandra is native to Mesoamerica and South America.

Species

References

Opiliaceae
Santalales genera